BGMEA University of Fashion and Technology or BUFT is a university in Bangladesh. It was established with the aim to produce technically competent human resources for the ready-made garments sector of the country.

History 
It was established by the Bangladesh Garment Manufacturers and Exporters Association (BGMEA) in 1999 as BGMEA Institute of Fashion & Technology (BIFT) which started functioning in 2000 and was affiliated to the National University, Bangladesh in 2001. BUFT, in collaboration with international organizations such as United Nations Industrial Development Organization (UNIDO), European Union (EU), German Technical Co-operation (GTZ), and the South Asia Enterprise Development fund (SEDF), is working for further growth and development.

Academic departments

Faculty of Science and Technology 

 Clothing Production and Technology
 Fashion Design and Technology
 Knitwear Production and Technology
 Textile Technology and Management
 Textile Engineering

Faculty of Arts and Social Sciences
 Department of English

Faculty of Business Education 

 Business Administration

Academic programs

Bachelor programs 
Textile Engineering
Textile Engineering & Management
Industrial Engineering

BBA major courses
 Apparel Merchandising (APM)
 Accounting (ACC)
 Finance (FIN)
 Human Resource Management (HRM)
 Marketing (MKT)
 International Business (IB)

B.Sc. program 
 Apparel Marchendising & Management (AMM)
 Apparel Manufacture and Technology  (AMT)
 Fashion Design & Technology  (FDT)
 Knitwear Manufacture & Technology  (KMT)
 Textile Engineering & Management  (TEM)
 Textile Engineering   (TE)
 Industrial Engineering (IE)

MBA program 

Masters of Business Administration in Apparel Merchandising (evening)

MBA in Apparel Merchandising is a two-year full-time master's degree program. A student has to earn 60 credits to be eligible for MBA Degree. After  completion of the program, a student will be competent to join as merchandisers in the RMG sector.

The MBA and B.Sc. honors courses are governed by the rules and regulations of BUFT approved by the academic council of the National University.

PGD program 

PGD in Apparel Merchandising is a one-year program.A student has to earn 42 credits to be eligible for PGD Degree. After  completion of the program, a student will be competent to join as merchandisers in the RMG sector.

List of vice-chancellors 

 Prof. S. M. Mahfuzur Rahman ( 12 March 2020 – present )

International cooperation
An agreement of cooperation was signed with Wuhan Textile University to develop a joint undergraduate major for fashion design.

On 30 August 2015, BGMEA University of Fashion and Technology (BUFT) and Goethe-Institut in Bangladesh signed a Memorandum of Understanding (MoU). This MoU is a framework of mutual interest in the fields of educational and academic exchanges, joint fashion competitions, research, internships, and academic transfer agreements and will encourage international cultural exchanges between BUFT and Goethe-Institut. Under the MoU, both parties will host local and international fashion workshops and exhibitions for German and Bangladeshi students.

See also
Textile schools in Bangladesh

References

External links
 Official website

Universities of Uttara
Private universities in Bangladesh
Textile schools in Bangladesh